Ambrosine Phillpotts (13 September 1912 – 12 October 1980) was a British actress of theatre, TV, radio and film. The Times wrote, "She was one of the last great stage aristocrats, a stylish comedienne best known for playing on stage and screen a succession of increasingly 'grandes dames' with an endearing mixture of Edwardian snobbery and eccentric absent-mindedness".

Partial filmography

 This Man Is Mine (1946) - Lady Daubney
 The Chiltern Hundreds (1949) - Lady Fielding
 The Franchise Affair (1951) - Miss Spence
 Happy Go Lovely (1951) - Lady Martin
 Mr. Denning Drives North (1952) - Miss Blade
 Angels One Five (1952) - Mother at Party (uncredited)
 Stolen Face (1952) - Miss Patten - Fur Department Clerk
 Father's Doing Fine (1952) - Nurse Pynegar (uncredited)
 The Captain's Paradise (1953) - Marjorie (with the major)
 Aunt Clara (1954) - Sylvia Levington (uncredited)
 The Adventures of Quentin Durward (1955) - Lady Hameline (uncredited)
 The Battle of the River Plate (1956) - Mrs. Millington-Drake, Montevideo (uncredited)
 Up in the World (1956) - Lady Banderville
 The Truth About Women (1957) - Lady Tavistock
 The Duke Wore Jeans (1958) - Duchess Cynthia Whitecliffe
 The Reluctant Debutante (1958) - Miss Grey - Secretary (uncredited)
 Room at the Top (1959) - Mrs. Brown
 Operation Bullshine (1959) - Reporter
 Expresso Bongo (1959) - Lady Rosemary
 Doctor in Love (1960) - Lady Spratt
 Carry On Regardless (1961) - Yoki's Owner
 Raising the Wind (1961) - Mrs. Featherstone
 Two and Two Make Six (1962) - Lady Smith-Adams
 Carry On Cabby (1963) - Aristocratic Lady
 Life at the Top (1965) - Mrs. Margaret Brown
 Berserk! (1967) - Miss Burrows
 Follow Me! (1972) - Dinner Guest (uncredited)
 Ooh… You Are Awful (1972) - Lady Missenden Green
 Diamonds on Wheels (1974) - Lady Truesdale
 Wilde Alliance ('Flower Power', episode) (1978) - Mrs. Tregaskis
 The Wildcats of St Trinian's (1980) - Mrs Mowbray (Last appearance)

References

External links

1912 births
1980 deaths
Actresses from London
British film actresses
20th-century British actresses
20th-century English women
20th-century English people